The 1870 Mid Surrey by-election was fought on 17 October 1870.  The byelection was fought due to the succession to a peerage of the incumbent Conservative MP William Brodrick.  It was won by the unopposed Conservative candidate Richard Baggallay.

References

1870 elections in the United Kingdom
1870 in England
By-elections to the Parliament of the United Kingdom in Surrey constituencies
Unopposed by-elections to the Parliament of the United Kingdom in English constituencies
19th century in Surrey